The Order of the Croatian Trefoil is the sixteenth most important medal given by the Republic of Croatia. The order was founded on 1 April 1995. The medal is awarded for excellence in war, direct war danger or in extraordinary circumstances in peacetime.

Recipients are Anton Tus, who served as a colonel general and the chief of staff of the Yugoslav Air Force before becoming the chief of general staff of the Armed Forces of the Republic of Croatia, Vasily Sikorski, a Croatian wartime reporter, and diplomat to Ukraine, Slavko Burda, Ivan Čehok a previous mayor of Varaždin, Josip Đakić member of Croatian parliament, Vesna Getoš (Posthumously), Vesna Girardi-Jurkić an archeologist, museologist and ex minister of education, Antun Hila (Posthumous), Žarko Inhof, Damir Junušić, Zlatko Kajmić, dr. Boris Kandare, Vladimir Kopf (Posthumous), Zvonko Kovač, Ivan Križić, Darko Matić, Ana Matoš, Zlatko Menges, Željko Mikić, Ivan Minčir, Antun Palarić, dr. Jurica Pavelić, Franjo Petrović, Ivan Raguž, Marijan Ramušćak, Željko Ronta, Kreško Slatković, Stipo Šermet, dr. Marko Škreb, Krešimir Šlafhauzer, Ivan Stark (Posthumous), Vladimir Štengl, Miro Turalija, Ivica Turkalj, Miljenko Vranić, Goran Zobundžija (Posthumous) and Ivan Žigrović.

See also
 Military Order of the Iron Trefoil

References 

Orders, decorations, and medals of Croatia
Awards established in 1995
1995 establishments in Croatia